The 1995 Cleveland Indians season was the Major League Baseball season that led to the Indians returning to the World Series for the first time since 1954. In a season that started late by 18 games – giving it just 144 games – the Indians finished in first place in the American League Central Division with a record of 100 wins and 44 losses. This was the first team in the history of the American League ever to win 100 games in a season that had fewer than 154 games.

The most outstanding pitcher for the Indians was their relief pitcher, José Mesa, who finished second in the voting for the American League's Cy Young Award. Mesa pitched in 62 games; he led the league by being the finishing pitcher in 57 games, and he saved a league-leading 46 games, even though he pitched just exactly 64 innings. Mesa was the winning pitcher in three games, and he lost none. Mesa's earned run average was a microscopic 1.13. Mesa only gave up eight earned runs, one unearned run, and three home runs in the entire regular season.

The most outstanding batter and everyday player for the Indians was their left fielder, Albert Belle, who finished second in the voting for the American League's Most Valuable Player Award. Belle played in 143 of the 144 games, and became the first major leaguer to hit 50 doubles and 50 home runs in a single season. Belle led the league in runs scored (121), runs batted in (126), doubles (52), home runs (50), total bases (377), and slugging percentage (.690). Belle had 173 hits and a batting average of .317.

The second most outstanding batter and everyday player for the Indians was their right fielder, Manny Ramirez. Ramirez played in 137 games, scored 85 runs, batted in 107 runs, hit 26 doubles and 31 home runs, had 149 hits, and batted .308.

On a team that was led by its outfielders in batting, the Indians center fielder Kenny Lofton, playing in just 118 games, also had 149 hits, scored 93 runs, batted .310, and led the American League with 13 triples and 54 stolen bases. This was Lofton's fourth of five consecutive years leading the American League in stolen bases. Lofton also won a Gold Glove in the outfield. Despite Lofton only hitting seven home runs he still finished the shortened season with 53 runs batted in.

The Indians won the Central Division by an overwhelming 30 games over the second-place Kansas City Royals, and they went into the playoffs going strong. In their American League Division Series, the Indians defeated the Boston Red Sox in a three game sweep. Next, in the American League Championship Series, the Indians defeated the Seattle Mariners four games to two. The Indians' starting pitcher, Orel Hershiser, was voted the American League Championship Series' Most Valuable Player.

In the World Series, the Indians faced the Atlanta Braves (champions of the National League for the third time in four years), who had finished the regular season with a 90–54 record, had defeated the Colorado Rockies three games to one in the National League Division Series, and had swept the Cincinnati Reds four games to none in the National League Championship Series. The Braves had the National League's Cy Young Award winner in Greg Maddux, who finished the season with a 19–2 won-loss record and a 1.63 earned run average as a starting pitcher. Maddux also finished in third place in the voting for Most Valuable Player.

The Indians lost the World Series to the Braves by four games to two, with the Braves winning all three games in Atlanta, and the Indians winning two out of three games in Cleveland. The World Series Most Valuable Player was the starting pitcher Tom Glavine of the Braves, who won two games in the Series.

Offseason
 November 9, 1994: Derek Lilliquist was selected off waivers from the Indians by the Atlanta Braves.
 November 18, 1994: Paul Byrd, Jerry Dipoto, Dave Mlicki and a player to be named later were traded by the Indians to the New York Mets for Jeromy Burnitz and Joe Roa. The Indians completed the deal by sending Jesus Azuaje (minors) to the Mets on December 6.
 November 21, 1994: Torey Lovullo was signed as a free agent by the Indians.
 March 25, 1995: Billy Ripken was signed as a free agent with the Indians. However, Ripken only played in six games for the Indians.

Regular season

The Indians led the Majors in nearly every offensive category, including runs scored (840), hits (1,461), home runs (207), runs batted in (803), batting average (.291) and slugging percentage (.479). They also struck out the fewest times (766) of all 28 MLB teams. They also had one of the most formidable pitching staffs in the AL, allowing the second-fewest hits (1,261), finishing with the best ERA (3.83), the fewest runs allowed (607), fewest earned runs allowed (554), the most saves (50) and the fewest intentional walks (16).

Season standings

Record vs. opponents

Notable transactions
 April 5, 1995: Dave Winfield was signed as a free agent by the Indians. However, Winfield only played in 39 games as a designated hitter in the regular season, and none in the postseason, and he retired at the end of the season.
 April 10, 1995: Paul Assenmacher was signed as a free agent by the Indians.
 April 25, 1995: Bud Black was signed as a free agent by the Indians.
 May 5, 1995: Casey Candaele was signed as a free agent by the Indians.
 May 15, 1995: Matt Williams was traded by the Indians to the Houston Astros for Eddie Tucker.
 June 6, 1995: Todd Frohwirth was signed as a free agent by the Indians.
 July 14, 1995: Bud Black was released by the Indians.
 July 27, 1995: David Bell, Rick Heiserman, and Pepe McNeal (minors) were traded by the Indians to the St. Louis Cardinals for Ken Hill.

Roster

Game log

|- style="background:#bfb;"
| 1 || April 27 || @ Rangers || 11–6 || Martinez (1–0) || Gross (0–1) || – || The Ballpark in Arlington || 32,161 || 1–0 || W1 
|- style="background:#fbb;"
| 2 || April 28 || @ Rangers || 9–10 || Whiteside (1–0) || Poole (0–1) || Russell (1) || The Ballpark in Arlington || 22,179 || 1–1 || L1
|- style="background:#fbb;"
| 3 || April 29 || @ Rangers || 5–6 || Burrows (1–0) || Shuey (0–1) || – || The Ballpark in Arlington || 28,048 || 1–2 || L2
|- style="background:#bfb;"
| 4 || April 30 || @ Rangers || 7–6  || Mesa (1–0) || Whiteside (1–1) || – || The Ballpark in Arlington || 26,026 || 2–2 || W1
|-

|- style="background:#bfb;"
| 5 || May 2 || @ Tigers || 11–1 || Martinez (2–0) || Bergman (0–2) || – || Tiger Stadium || 39,398 || 3–2 || W2
|- style="background:#bfb;"
| 6 || May 3 || @ Tigers || 14–7 || Clark (1–0) || Doherty (0–2) || – || Tiger Stadium || 29,996 || 4–2 || W3
|- style="background:#fbb;"
| 7 || May 4 || @ Tigers || 3–4 || Wells (1–1) || Hershiser (0–1) || Henneman (1) || Tiger Stadium || 28,846 || 4–3 || L1
|- style="background:#bfb;"
| 8 || May 5 || Twins || 5–1 || Nagy (1–0) || Erickson (0–3) || Mesa (1) || Jacobs Field || 41,434 || 5–3 || W1
|- style="background:#fbb;"
| 9 || May 6 || Twins || 2–5 || Radke (1–0) || Black (0–1) || Aguilera (4) || Jacobs Field || 37,325 || 5–4 || L1
|- style="background:#bfb;"
| 10 || May 7 || Twins || 10–9  || Poole (1–1) || Guthrie (1–1) || – || Jacobs Field || 39,431 || 6–4 || W1
|- style="background:#bfb;"
| 11 || May 8 || Royals || 6–2 || Clark (2–0) || Appier (3–1) || Grimsley (1) || Jacobs Field || 26,704 || 7–4 || W2
|- style="background:#bfb;"
| 12 || May 9 || Royals || 10–0 || Hershiser (1–1) || Linton (0–1) || – || Jacobs Field || 27,225 || 8–4 || W3
|- style="background:#bfb;"
| 13 || May 10 || Royals || 3–2  || Plunk (1–0) || Meacham (1–2) || – || Jacobs Field || 27,749 || 9–4 || W4
|- style="background:#bfb;"
| 14 || May 12 || @ Orioles || 3–2 || Martinez (3–0) || Brown (2–1) || Mesa (2) || Oriole Park at Camden Yards || 40,516 || 10–4 || W5
|- style="background:#fbb;"
| 15 || May 13 || @ Orioles || 1–6 || Mussina (2–1) || Clark (2–1) || – || Oriole Park at Camden Yards || 40,185 || 10–5 || L1
|- style="background:#bfb;"
| 16 || May 14 || @ Orioles || 3–1 || Hershiser (2–1) || Rhodes (1–2) || Mesa (3) || Oriole Park at Camden Yards || 39,167 || 11–5 || W1
|- style="background:#bfb;"
| 17 || May 16 || @ Yankees || 10–5 || Nagy (2–0) || Key (1–2) || – || Yankee Stadium || 18,246 || 12–5 || W2
|- style="background:#bbb;"
| – || May 17 || @ Yankees || colspan=8 | Postponed (rain, makeup August 10)
|- style="background:#fbb;"
| 18 || May 18 || @ Red Sox || 3–4 || Belinda (2–0) || Poole (1–2) || – || Fenway Park || 24,285 || 12–6 || L1
|- style="background:#bfb;"
| 19 || May 19 || @ Red Sox || 9–5 || Tavarez (1–0) || Ryan (0–1) || – || Fenway Park || 23,507 || 13–6 || W1
|- style="background:#bfb;"
| 20 || May 20 || @ Red Sox || 7–5 || Plunk (2–0) || Pena (1–1) || Mesa (4) || Fenway Park || 29,412 || 14–6 || W2
|- style="background:#bfb;"
| 21 || May 21 || @ Red Sox || 12–10 || Assenmacher (1–0) || Pierce (0–2) || Mesa (5) || Fenway Park || 32,339 || 15–6 || W3
|- style="background:#fbb;"
| 22 || May 22 || Brewers || 5–7 || Bones (3–1) || Nagy (2–1) || Fetters (2) || Jacobs Field || 34,464 || 15–7 || L1
|- style="background:#bfb;"
| 23 || May 23 || Brewers || 5–3 || Martinez (4–0) || Sparks (1–1) || Mesa (6) || Jacobs Field || 35,373 || 16–7 || W1
|- style="background:#fbb;"
| 24 || May 24 || Brewers || 5–7 || Rightnowar (1–0) || Clark (2–2) || Fetters (3) || Jacobs Field || 29,638 || 16–8 || L1
|- style="background:#bfb;"
| 25 || May 26 || @ Blue Jays || 7–4 || Hershiser (3–1) || Hentgen (3–2) || Mesa (7) || Skydome || 47,113 || 17–8 || W1
|- style="background:#fbb;"
| 26 || May 27 || @ Blue Jays || 0–3 || Leiter (2–2) || Plunk (2–1) || Hall (3) || Skydome || 47,143 || 17–9 || L1
|- style="background:#bfb;"
| 27 || May 28 || @ Blue Jays || 5–4 || Nagy (3–1) || Darwin (1–4) || Mesa (8) || Skydome || 42,365 || 18–9 || W1
|- style="background:#bfb;"
| 28 || May 29 || White Sox || 7–6 || Tavarez (2–0) || DeLeon  (2–1)|| Mesa (9) || Jacobs Field || 41,736 || 19–9 || W2
|- style="background:#bfb;"
| 29 || May 30 || White Sox || 2–1 || Assenmacher (2–0) || Fernandez (2–4) || Mesa (10) || Jacobs Field || 33,038 || 20–9 || W3
|- style="background:#bfb;"
| 30 || May 31 || White Sox || 6–3 || Hershiser (4–1) || Abbott (2–2) || Mesa (11) || Jacobs Field || 36,771 || 21–9 || W4
|-

|- style="background:#bfb;"
| 31 || June 1 || White Sox || 7–4 || Black (1–1) || Bere (1–4) || Plunk (1) || Jacobs Field || 33,260 || 22–9 || W5
|- style="background:#fbb;"
| 32 || June 2 || Blue Jays || 0–5 || Leiter (3–2) || Nagy (3–2) || Timlin (2) || Jacobs Field || 41,545 || 22–10 || L1
|- style="background:#bfb;"
| 33 || June 3 || Blue Jays || 3–0 || Martinez (5–0) || Darwin (1–5) || – || Jacobs Field || 41,566 || 23–10 || W1
|- style="background:#bfb;"
| 34 || June 4 || Blue Jays || 9–8 || Tavarez (3–0) || Hall (0–1) || – || Jacobs Field || 41,688 || 24–10 || W2
|- style="background:#bfb;"
| 35 || June 5 || Tigers || 8–0 || Hershiser (5–1) || Bergman (1–4) || – || Jacobs Field || 34,615 || 25–10 || W3
|- style="background:#bfb;"
| 36 || June 6 || Tigers || 4–3 || Tavarez (4–0) || Boever (3–3) || Mesa (12) || Jacobs Field || 36,115 || 26–10 || W4
|- style="background:#bfb;"
| 37 || June 7 || Tigers || 3–2  || Plunk (3–0) || Maxcy (2–1) || – || Jacobs Field || 36,363 || 27–10 || W5
|- style="background:#bfb;"
| 38 || June 8 || @ Brewers || 8–7 || Tavarez (5–0) || Lloyd (0–5) || Mesa (13) || County Stadium || 17,641 || 28–10 || W6
|- style="background:#bfb;"
| 39 || June 9 || @ Brewers || 7–4 || Ogea (1–0) || Roberson (1–2) || Mesa (14) || County Stadium || 13,136 || 29–10 || W7
|- style="background:#fbb;"
| 40 || June 10 || @ Brewers || 1–6 || Miranda (3–2) || Hershiser (5–2) || Reyes (1) || County Stadium || 18,869 || 29–11 || L1
|- style="background:#bfb;"
| 41 || June 11 || @ Brewers || 11–5 || Black (2–1) || Scanlan (3–4) || – || County Stadium || 18,706 || 30–11 || W1
|- style="background:#bfb;"
| 42 || June 12 || Orioles || 4–3 || Nagy (4–2) || Brown (5–4) || Mesa (15) || Jacobs Field || 41,845 || 31–11 || W2
|- style="background:#bfb;"
| 43 || June 13 || Orioles || 11–0 || Martinez (6–0) || Mussina (5–4) || – || Jacobs Field || 41,927 || 32–11 || W3
|- style="background:#bfb;"
| 44 || June 14 || Orioles || 5–2 || Ogea (2–0) || Klingenbeck (1–1) || Mesa (16) || Jacobs Field || 41,839 || 33–11 || W4
|- style="background:#fbb;"
| 45 || June 16 || Yankees || 2–4 || Wickman (2–1) || Poole (1–3) || Wetteland (8) || Jacobs Field || 41,643 || 33–12 || L1
|- style="background:#bfb;"
| 46 || June 17 || Yankees || 7–4 || Black (3–1) || Pettitte (1–4) || Mesa (17) || Jacobs Field || 41,662 || 34–12 || W1
|- style="background:#fbb;"
| 47 || June 18 || Yankees || 5–9 || McDowell (3–4) || Nagy (4–3) || Wetteland (9) || Jacobs Field || 41,667 || 34–13 || L1
|- style="background:#bfb;"
| 48 || June 19 || Red Sox || 4–3  || Plunk (4–1) || Ryan (0–3) || – || Jacobs Field || 41,645 || 35–13 || W1
|- style="background:#bfb;"
| 49 || June 20 || Red Sox || 9–2 || Ogea (3–0) || Eshelman (3–1) || – || Jacobs Field || 40,190 || 36–13 || W2
|- style="background:#fbb;"
| 50 || June 21 || Red Sox || 1–3 || Hanson (7–1) || Hershiser (5–3) || Belinda (3) || Jacobs Field || 41,948 || 36–14 || L1
|- style="background:#fbb;"
| 51 || June 23 || @ White Sox || 5–12 || Bere (3–6) || Nagy (4–4) || – || Comiskey Park || 31,962 || 36–15 || L2
|- style="background:#fbb;"
| 52 || June 24 || @ White Sox || 3–8 || Fernandez (3–4) || Black (3–2) || – || Comiskey Park || 35,028 || 36–16 || L3
|- style="background:#fbb;"
| 53 || June 25 || @ White Sox || 2–3 || DeLeon (3–3) || Assenmacher (2–1) || Radinsky (1) || Comiskey Park || 27,514 || 36–17 || L4
|- style="background:#bfb;"
| 54 || June 26 || @ Royals || 2–0 || Ogea (4–0) || Gordon (5–3) || Mesa (18) || Kauffman Stadium || 24,296 || 37–17 || W1
|- style="background:#bfb;"
| 55 || June 27 || @ Royals || 7–1 || Clark (3–2) || Haney (3–2) || – || Kauffman Stadium || 19,510 || 38–17 || W2
|- style="background:#bfb;"
| 56 || June 28 || @ Royals || 5–2 || Nagy (5–4) || Appier (11–3) || Mesa (19) || Kauffman Stadium || 18,596 || 39–17 || W3
|- style="background:#bfb;"
| 57 || June 29 || @ Twins || 10–5 || Black (4–2) || Erickson (3–6) || – || Hubert H. Humphrey Metrodome || 17,116 || 40–17 || W4
|- style="background:#bfb;"
| 58 || June 30 || @ Twins || 4–1 || Martinez (7–0) || Trombley (0–3) || Mesa (20) || Hubert H. Humphrey Metrodome || 27,416 || 41–17 || W5
|-

|- style="background:#fbb;"
| 59 || July 1|| @ Twins || 5–6 || Radke (4–7) || Ogea (4–1)  || Aguilera (12) || Hubert H. Humphrey Metrodome || 18,820 || 41–18 || L1
|- style="background:#bfb;"
| 60 || July 2 || @ Twins || 7–0 || Clark (4–2) || Harris (0–2)|| – || Hubert H. Humphrey Metrodome || 16,790 || 42–18 || W1
|- style="background:#bfb;"
| 61 || July 3 || Rangers || 9–1 || Nagy (6–4) || Rogers (8–4) || – || Jacobs Field || 41,713 || 43–18 || W2
|- style="background:#fbb;"
| 62 || July 4 || Rangers || 6–7 || McDowell (4–0) || Assenmacher (2–2) || Whiteside (1) || Jacobs Field || 41,769 || 43–19 || L1
|- style="background:#bfb;"
| 63 || July 5 || Rangers || 2–0 || Martinez (8–0) || Gross (3–8) || Mesa (21) || Jacobs Field || 41,881 || 44–19 || W1
|- style="background:#bfb;"
| 64 || July 6 || Mariners || 8–1 || Ogea (5–1) || Belcher (4–4) || – || Jacobs Field || 41,661 || 45–19 || W2
|- style="background:#fbb;"
| 65 || July 7 || Mariners || 3–5 || Johnson (9–1) || Clark (4–3) || – || Jacobs Field || 41,741 || 45–20 || L1
|- style="background:#bfb;"
| 66 || July 8 || Mariners || 7–3 || Nagy (7–4) || Bosio (6–3) || – || Jacobs Field || 41,893 || 46–20 || W1
|- style="background:#fbb;"
| 67 || July 9 || Mariners || 3–9 || Torres (3–5) || Hershiser (5–4) || – || Jacobs Field || 41,897 || 46–21 || L1
|- bgcolor=#bbcaff
| – || July 11 || 66th All-Star Game || colspan=8 | National League vs. American League (The Ballpark in Arlington, Arlington, Texas)
|- style="background:#bbb;"
| – || July 13 || Athletics || colspan=8 | Postponed (rain, makeup July 14)
|- style="background:#bfb;"
| 68 || July 14  || Athletics || 1–0 || Embree (1–0) || Prieto (0–2) || Mesa (22) || Jacobs Field || N/A || 47–21 || W1
|- style="background:#bfb;"
| 69 || July 14  || Athletics || 7–6 || Nagy (8–4) || Darling (2–5) || Mesa (23) || Jacobs Field || 41,862 || 48–21 || W2
|- style="background:#bfb;"
| 70 || July 15 || Athletics || 7–2 || Hershiser (6–4) || Ontiveros (8–4) || Plunk (2) || Jacobs Field || 41,726 || 49–21 || W3
|- style="background:#bfb;"
| 71 || July 16 || Athletics || 5–4  || Embree (2–0) || Eckersley (2–3) || – || Jacobs Field || 41,767 || 50–21 || W4
|- style="background:#fbb;"
| 72 || July 17 || Angels || 3–8 || Anderson (3–2) || Ogea (5–2) || – || Jacobs Field || 41,583 || 50–22 || L1
|- style="background:#bfb;"
| 73 || July 18 || Angels || 7–5 || Assenmacher (3–2) || Smith (0–3) || – || Jacobs Field || 41,763 || 51–22 || W1
|- style="background:#bfb;"
| 74 || July 19 || @ Rangers || 14–5 || Nagy (9–4) || Gross (4–9) || – || The Ballpark in Arlington || 42,928 || 52–22 || W2
|- style="background:#bfb;"
| 75 || July 20 || @ Rangers || 6–3 || Hershiser (7–4) || Brandenburg (0–1) || Mesa (24) || The Ballpark in Arlington || 28,160 || 53–22 || W3
|- style="background:#bfb;"
| 76 || July 21 || @ Athletics || 6–1 || Martinez (9–0) || Stottlemyre (8–3) || – || Oakland–Alameda County Coliseum || 21,158 || 54–22 || W4
|- style="background:#bfb;"
| 77 || July 22 || @ Athletics || 6–4 || Tavarez (6–0) || Eckersley (2–4) || Mesa (25) || Oakland–Alameda County Coliseum || 33,019 || 55–22 || W5
|- style="background:#bfb;"
| 78 || July 23 || @ Athletics || 2–0 || Clark (5–3) || Prieto (1–3) || Mesa (26) || Oakland–Alameda County Coliseum || 26,763 || 56–22 || W6
|- style="background:#bfb;"
| 79 || July 24 || @ Angels || 9–7  || Assenmacher (4–2) || Smith (0–4) || Mesa (27) || Anaheim Stadium || 30,367 || 57–22 || W7
|- style="background:#fbb;"
| 80 || July 25 || @ Angels || 5–6 || Finley (9–7) || Hershiser (7–5) || Smith (23) || Anaheim Stadium || 42,268 || 57–23 || L1
|- style="background:#fbb;"
| 81 || July 26 || @ Angels || 3–6 || Harkey (5–6) || Martinez (9–1) || Smith (24) || Anaheim Stadium || 35,650 || 57–24 || L2
|- style="background:#fbb;"
| 82 || July 27 || @ Mariners || 5–11 || Belcher (7–5) || Ogea (5–3) || – || Kingdome || 20,121 || 57–25 || L3
|- style="background:#bfb;"
| 83 || July 28 || @ Mariners || 6–5 || Plunk (5–1) || Frey (0–4) || Mesa (28) || Kingdome || 17,609 || 58–25 || W1
|- style="background:#fbb;"
| 84 || July 29 || @ Mariners || 3–5 || Bosio (7–5) || Embree (2–1) || Ayala (16) || Kingdome || 43,874 || 58–26 || L1
|- style="background:#bfb;"
| 85 || July 30 || @ Mariners || 5–2 || Hershiser (8–5) || Torres (3–8) || Mesa (29) || Kingdome || 24,089 || 59–26 || W1
|- 

|- style="background:#fbb;"
| 86 || August 1 || Twins || 5–6 || Mahomes (1–4) || Tavarez (6–1) || Stevens (5) || Jacobs Field || 42,023 || 59–27 || L1
|- style="background:#bfb;"
| 87 || August 2 || Twins || 12–6 || Clark (6–3) || Harris (0–5) || – || Jacobs Field || 41,947 || 60–27 || W1
|- style="background:#bfb;"
| 88 || August 3 || Twins || 6–4 || Hill (7–7) || Radke (7–10) || Mesa (30) || Jacobs Field || 41,907 || 61–27 || W2
|- style="background:#bfb;"
| 89 || August 4 || White Sox || 13–3 || Nagy (10–4) || Bere (5–10) || – || Jacobs Field || 41,895 || 62–27 || W3
|- style="background:#bfb;"
| 90 || August 5 || White Sox || 11–7 || Hershiser (9–5) || Fernandez (5–8) || – || Jacobs Field || 41,657 || 63–27 || W4
|- style="background:#fbb;"
| 91 || August 6 || White Sox || 1–5 || Righetti (3–0) || Martinez (9–2) || – || Jacobs Field || 41,975 || 63–28 || L1
|- style="background:#fbb;"
| 92 || August 8 || @ Red Sox || 1–5 || Wakefield (13–1) || Clark (6–4) || – || Fenway Park || 34,574 || 63–29 || L2
|- style="background:#fbb;"
| 93 || August 9 || @ Red Sox || 5–9 || Hanson (10–4) || Plunk (5–2) || – || Fenway Park || 34,240 || 63–30 || L3
|- style="background:#bfb;"
| 94 || August 10  || @ Yankees || 10–9 || Poole (2–3) || Wetteland (1–2) || Mesa (31) || Yankee Stadium || N/A || 64–30 || W1
|- style="background:#bfb;"
| 95 || August 10  || @ Yankees || 5–2 || Ogea (6–3) || Hitchcock (5–7)  ||Mesa (32) || Yankee Stadium || 48,115 || 65–30 || W2
|- style="background:#bfb;"
| 96 || August 11 || @ Yankees || 5–4  || Tavarez (7–1) || Wetteland (1–3) || Mesa (33) || Yankee Stadium || 33,739 || 66–30 || W3
|- style="background:#fbb;"
| 97 || August 12 || @ Yankees || 2–3 || McDowell (10–8) || Martinez (9–3) || – || Yankee Stadium || 35,795 || 66–31 || L1
|- style="background:#fbb;"
| 98 || August 13 || @ Yankees || 1–4 || Cone (13–6) || Clark (6–5) || – || Yankee Stadium || 45,866 || 66–32 || L2
|- style="background:#bfb;"
| 99 || August 14 || @ Orioles || 9–6 || Assenmacher (5–2) || Benitez (1–4) || Mesa (34) || Oriole Park at Camden Yards || 47,198 || 67–32 || W1
|- style="background:#fbb;"
| 100 || August 15 || @ Orioles || 3–8 || Erickson (8–9) || Nagy (10–5) || – || Oriole Park at Camden Yards || 46,346 || 67–33 || L1
|- style="background:#bfb;"
| 101 || August 16 || @ Orioles || 8–5 || Hershiser (10–5) || Brown (5–8) || Mesa (35) || Oriole Park at Camden Yards || 47,140 || 68–33 || W1
|- style="background:#fbb;"
| 102 || August 17 || Brewers || 3–7 || McAndrew (1–2) || Martinez (9–4) || Fetters (19) || Jacobs Field || 40,505 || 68–34 || L1
|- style="background:#bfb;"
| 103 || August 18 || Brewers || 7–5 || Clark (7–5) || Bones (7–9) || Mesa (36) || Jacobs Field || 41,752 || 69–34 || W1
|- style="background:#bfb;"
| 104 || August 19 || Brewers || 4–3 || Plunk (6–2) || Wegman (5–5) || – || Jacobs Field || 41,939 || 70–34 || W2
|- style="background:#bfb;"
| 105 || August 20 || Brewers || 8–5 || Tavarez (8–1) || Sparks (7–7) || Mesa (37) || Jacobs Field || 41,799 || 71–34 || W3
|- style="background:#bfb;"
| 106 || August 21 || @ Blue Jays || 7–3 || Hershiser (11–5) || Hurtado (5–2) || Embree (1) || Skydome || 39,187 || 72–34 || W4
|- style="background:#fbb;"
| 107 || August 22 || @ Blue Jays || 4–5 || Castillo (1–2) || Tavarez (8–2) || – || Skydome || 39,293 || 72–35 || L1
|- style="background:#bfb;"
| 108 || August 23 || @ Blue Jays || 6–5 || Poole (3–3) || Carrara (1–3) || Mesa (38) || Skydome || 41,169 || 73–35 || W1
|- style="background:#bfb;"
| 109 || August 25 || Tigers || 6–5  || Tavarez (9–2) || Lira (8–9) || – || Jacobs Field || 41,676 || 74–35 || W2
|- style="background:#bfb;"
| 110 || August 26 || Tigers || 6–2 || Nagy (11–5) || Moore (5–14) || – || Jacobs Field || 41,744 || 75–35 || W3
|- style="background:#bfb;"
| 111 || August 27 || Tigers || 9–2 || Hershiser (12–5) || Lima (1–6) || – || Jacobs Field || 41,616 || 76–35 || W4
|- style=" background:#bfb;"
| 112 || August 28 || Blue Jays || 9–1 || Ogea (7–3) || Carrara (1–4) || – || Jacobs Field || 40,283 || 77–35 || W5
|- style="background:#bfb;"
| 113 || August 29 || Blue Jays || 4–1 || Clark (8–5) || Guzman (3–10) || – || Jacobs Field || 41,257 || 78–35 || W6
|- style="background:#bfb;"
| 114 || August 30 || Blue Jays || 4–3  || Assenmacher (6–2) || Castillo (1–3) || – || Jacobs Field || 41,807 || 79–35 || W7
|- style="background:#bfb;"
| 115 || August 31 || Blue Jays || 6–4  || Mesa (2–0) || Rogers (2–3) || – || Jacobs Field || 41,746 || 80–35 || W8
|- 

|- style="background:#bfb;"
| 116 || September 1 || @ Tigers || 14–4 || Nagy (12–5) || Lima (1–7) || – || Tiger Stadium || 16,155 || 81–35 || W9
|- style="background:#fbb;"
| 117 || September 2 || @ Tigers || 2–3 || Lira (9–9) || Hershiser (12–6) || Doherty (4) || Tiger Stadium || 22,426 || 81–36 || L1
|- style="background:#bfb;"
| 118 || September 3 || @ Tigers || 9–8  || Mesa (3–0) || Boever (5–7) || – || Tiger Stadium || 25,393 || 82–36 || W1
|- style="background:#fbb;"
| 119 || September 4 || @ Tigers || 2–3 || Sodowsky (1–0) || Clark (8–6) || Henry (1) || Tiger Stadium || 24,987 || 82–37 || L1
|- style="background:#bfb;"
| 120 || September 5 || @ Brewers || 7–3 || Martinez (10–4) || Sparks (7–8) || – || County Stadium || 12,129 || 83–37 || W1
|- style="background:#bfb;"
| 121 || September 6 || @ Brewers || 12–2 || Hill (8–7) || Givens (5–3) || – || County Stadium || 10,042 || 84–37 || W2
|- style="background:#bfb;"
| 122 || September 7 || Mariners || 4–1 || Nagy (13–5) || Bosio (9–8) || Mesa (39) || Jacobs Field || 41,450 || 85–37 || W3
|- style="background:#bfb;"
| 123 || September 8 || Orioles || 3–2 || Hershiser (13–6) || Brown (7–9) || Mesa (40) || Jacobs Field || 41,656 || 86–37 || W4
|- style="background:#bfb;"
| 124 || September 9 || Orioles || 2–1 || Ogea (8–3) || Krivda (2–4) || Mesa (41) || Jacobs Field || 41,729 || 87–37 || W5
|- style="background:#bfb;"
| 125 || September 10 || Orioles || 5–3 || Tavarez (10–2) || Orosco (2–4) || Mesa (42) || Jacobs Field || 41,647 || 88–37 || W6
|- style="background:#fbb;"
| 126 || September 11 || Yankees || 0–4 || McDowell (14–10) || Martinez (10–5) || – || Jacobs Field || 41,835 || 88–38 || L1
|- style="background:#fbb;"
| 127 || September 12 || Yankees || 2–9 || Kamieniecki (5–5) || Hill (8–8) || – || Jacobs Field || 41,276 || 88–39 || L2
|- style="background:#bfb;"
| 128 || September 13 || Yankees || 5–0 || Nagy (14–5) || Cone (15–8) || – || Jacobs Field || 41,708 || 89–39 || W1
|- style="background:#bfb;"
| 129 || September 14 || Red Sox || 5–3 || Hershiser (14–6) || Eshelman (5–3) || Mesa (43) || Jacobs Field || 41,812 || 90–39 || W2
|- style="background:#fbb;"
| 130 || September 15 || Red Sox || 3–6 || Hanson (14–5) || Embree (2–2) || – || Jacobs Field || 41,833 || 90–40 || L1
|- style="background:#bfb;"
| 131 || September 16 || Red Sox || 6–5 || Clark (9–6) || Clemens (8–5) || Mesa (44) || Jacobs Field || 41,765 || 91–40 || W1
|- style="background:#fbb;"
| 132 || September 17 || Red Sox || 6–9 || Suppan (1–2) || Shuey (0–2) || Aguilera (29) || Jacobs Field || 41,723 || 91–41 || L1
|- style="background:#bfb;"
| 133 || September 18 || @ White Sox || 11–1 || Hill (9–8) || Alvarez (7–10) || – || Comiskey Park || 20,439 || 92–41 || W1
|- style="background:#bfb;"
| 134 || September 19 || @ White Sox || 8–2 || Nagy (15–5) || Andujar (2–1) || – || Comiskey Park || 18,468 || 93–41 || W2
|- style="background:#fbb;"
| 135 || September 20 || @ White Sox || 3–4 || Bere (8–13) || Roa (0–1) || Hernandez (31) || Comiskey Park || 17,171 || 93–42 || L1
|- style="background:#bfb;"
| 136 || September 22 || @ Royals || 5–3 || Hershiser (15–6) || Olson (3–3) || Mesa (45) || Kauffman Stadium || 16,562 || 94–42 || W1
|- style="background:#bfb;"
| 137 || September 23 || @ Royals || 7–3 || Martinez (11–5) || Gubicza (11–14) || – || Kauffman Stadium || 23,816 || 95–42 || W2
|- style="background:#fbb;"
| 138 || September 24 || @ Royals || 2–4 || Appier (15–9) || Clark (9–6) || – || Kauffman Stadium || 17,277 || 95–43 || L1
|- style="background:#fbb;"
| 139 || September 26 || @ Twins || 4–13 || Trombley (4–8) || Nagy (15–6) || – || Hubert H. Humphrey Metrodome || 9,825 || 95–44 || L2
|- style="background:#bfb;"
| 140 || September 27 || @ Twins || 9–6 || Hill (10–8) || Radke (11–14) || Mesa (46) || Hubert H. Humphrey Metrodome || 9,614 || 96–44 || W1
|- style="background:#bfb;"
| 141 || September 28 || @ Twins || 12–4 || Martinez (12–5) || Rodriguez (5–8) || – || Hubert H. Humphrey Metrodome || 9,442 || 97–44 || W2
|- style="background:#bfb;"
| 142 || September 29 || Royals || 9–2 || Hershiser (16–6) || Appier (15–10) || – || Jacobs Field || 41,701 || 98–44 || W3
|- style="background:#bfb;"
| 143 || September 30 || Royals || 3–2  || Embree (3–2) || Montgomery (2–3) || – || Jacobs Field || 41,578 || 99–44 || W4
|-

|- style="background:#bfb;"
| 144 || October 1 || Royals || 17–7 || Nagy (16–6) || Gordon (12–12) || – || Jacobs Field || 41,819 || 100–44 || W5
|-

Player stats

Batting

Starters by position
Note: Pos = Position; G = Games played; AB = At bats; H = Hits; Avg. = Batting average; HR = Home runs; RBI = Runs batted in

Other batters
Note: G = Games played; AB = At bats; H = Hits; Avg. = Batting average; HR = Home runs; RBI = Runs batted in

Pitching

Starting pitchers
Note: G = Games pitched; IP = Innings pitched; W = Wins; L = Losses; ERA = Earned run average; SO = Strikeouts

Other pitchers
Note: G = Games pitched; IP = Innings pitched; W = Wins; L = Losses; ERA = Earned run average; SO = Strikeouts

Relief pitchers
Note: G = Games pitched; W = Wins; L = Losses; SV = Saves; ERA = Earned run average; SO = Strikeouts

Post season

1995 American League Divisional Playoffs

Cleveland Indians vs. Boston Red Sox
Cleveland wins the series, 3-0

Game 1, October 3
Jacobs Field, Cleveland, Ohio

Game 2, October 4
Jacobs Field, Cleveland, Ohio

Game 3, October 6
Fenway Park, Boston, Massachusetts

1995 American League Championship Series

Matchups

Game 1
October 10: Kingdome, Seattle, Washington

Game 2
October 11: Kingdome, Seattle, Washington

Game 3
October 13: Jacobs Field, Cleveland, Ohio

Game 4
October 14: Jacobs Field, Cleveland, Ohio

Game 5
October 15: Jacobs Field, Cleveland, Ohio

Game 6
October 17: Kingdome, Seattle, Washington

1995 World Series

Game 1
October 21, 1995, at Atlanta–Fulton County Stadium in Atlanta

Game 2
October 22, 1995, at Atlanta–Fulton County Stadium in Atlanta

Game 3
October 24, 1995, at Jacobs Field in Cleveland, Ohio

Game 4
October 25, 1995, at Jacobs Field in Cleveland, Ohio

Game 5
October 26, 1995, at Jacobs Field in Cleveland, Ohio

Game 6
October 28, 1995, at Atlanta–Fulton County Stadium in Atlanta

Game log

|- bgcolor="#ffbbbb"
| 1 || October 21 || @ Braves || 2–3 || Maddux (1–0) || Hershiser (0–1) || || Atlanta–Fulton County Stadium || 51,876 || 0–1 || L1
|- bgcolor="#ffbbbb"
| 2 || October 22 || @ Braves || 3–4 || Glavine (1–0) || Martínez (0–1) || Wohlers (1) || Atlanta–Fulton County Stadium || 51,877 || 0–2 || L2
|- bgcolor="#bbffbb"
| 3 || October 24 || Braves || 7–6 (11) || Mesa (1–0) || Peña (0–1) || || Jacobs Field || 43,584 || 1–2 || W1
|- bgcolor="#ffbbbb"
| 4 || October 25 || Braves || 2–5 || Avery (1–0) || Hill (0–1) || Borbón Jr. (1) || Jacobs Field || 43,578 || 1–3 || L1
|- bgcolor="#bbffbb"
| 5 || October 26 || Braves || 5–4 || Hershiser (1–1) || Maddux (1–1) || Mesa (1) || Jacobs Field || 43,595 || 2–3 || W1
|- bgcolor="#ffbbbb"
| 6 || October 28 || @ Braves || 0–1 || Glavine (2–0) || Poole (0–1) || Wohlers (2) || Atlanta–Fulton County Stadium || 51,875 || 2–4 || L1
|-

|- style="text-align:center;"
| Legend:       = Win       = Loss       = PostponementBold = Indians team member

Award winners

Hershiser became the Most Valuable Player of the 1995 American League Championship Series against the Seattle Mariners, and he is the only player to win the League Championship series Most Valuable Player Award in both leagues.

All-Star Game
 Carlos Baerga, second base, starter
 Albert Belle, outfield, starter
 Kenny Lofton, outfield, starter
 Dennis Martínez, pitcher, reserve
 José Mesa, relief pitcher, reserve
 Manny Ramírez, outfield, reserve

Minor league affiliates

References

 1995 Cleveland Indians team at Baseball-Reference
 1995 Cleveland Indians team at baseball-almanac.com
 1995 WS at Baseball-Reference

Further reading
 

Cleveland Guardians seasons
Cleveland Indians season
American League champion seasons
American League Central champion seasons
Cleve